John Alexander (April 16, 1777 – June 28, 1848) was a U.S. Representative from Ohio.

Born at Crowsville, in the Spartanburg District, South Carolina, Alexander attended the public schools.
He moved to Butler County, Ohio, and thence to Miamisburg, Montgomery County, in 1803.
He studied law.
He was admitted to the bar and commenced practice in 1804.
He moved to Xenia, Ohio, in 1805 and continued his profession there, also practicing in Columbus, Chillicothe, and before the Supreme Court of the United States at Washington, D.C.
He was appointed prosecuting attorney in 1808 and held that office until 1833, except during the time he was a Member of Congress.

Alexander was elected as a Democratic-Republican to the Thirteenth and Fourteenth Congresses (March 4, 1813 – March 3, 1817).
He was an unsuccessful candidate for reelection in 1816 to the Fifteenth Congress.
He resumed the practice of law at Xenia.
He served as member of the State senate in 1822 and 1823.

He retired from the practice of his profession in 1834.
He died at Xenia, Ohio, June 28, 1848.
He was interred in Woodlawn Cemetery.

References

Sources 

1777 births
1848 deaths

Ohio state senators
Politicians from Xenia, Ohio
County district attorneys in Ohio
People from Spartanburg County, South Carolina
Democratic-Republican Party members of the United States House of Representatives from Ohio